St. Andrews Island may refer to:
A former name of the Kunta Kinteh Island
A small island in St. Andrews Bay (Florida), USA 
A small island by St. Andrews, Nova Scotia, Canada